Timur Ansarovich Ayupov (born 26 July 1993) is a Russian football defensive midfielder. He plays for FC Orenburg.

Club career
He made his debut in the Russian Second Division for FC Rubin-2 Kazan on 1 August 2013 in a game against FC Nosta Novotroitsk.

On 12 July 2019, he signed a contract with Russian Premier League club FC Orenburg. He made his debut in the Russian Premier League for Orenburg on 13 July 2019 in a game against FC Rostov.

Personal life
His father Ansar Ayupov also was a footballer.

Career statistics

References

External links
 
 

1993 births
Footballers from Moscow
Living people
Russian footballers
Association football midfielders
FC Rubin Kazan players
FC Nizhny Novgorod (2015) players
FC Orenburg players
Russian Second League players
Russian First League players
Russian Premier League players